These are first-run syndicated television shows that air on commercial broadcast stations in a significant number of markets. If it has only aired in a few markets, it is not significantly important enough to be placed on this list. Note that shows listed here do not necessarily air in every market.

Current programs
These shows currently air in first-run syndication.

Talk shows
Access Daily with Mario & Kit (2010)
Dr. Phil (2002)
The Drew Barrymore Show (2020)
The Jennifer Hudson Show (2022)
Karamo (2022)
The Kelly Clarkson Show (2019)
Live with Kelly and Ryan (1988)
Rachael Ray (2006)
 Sherri (2022)
The Steve Wilkos Show (2007) 
Tamron Hall (2019)
TMZ Live (2013)

Tabloid/newsmagazine shows
Access Hollywood (1996)
Dish Nation (2012)
Entertainment Tonight (1981)
Extra (1994)
Inside Edition (1989)
TMZ (2007)

Game/competition shows
25 Words or Less (2019)
Family Feud (1999)
Funny You Should Ask (2017)
Jeopardy! (1984) 
Pictionary (2022)
Wheel of Fortune (1983)
You Bet Your Life (2021)

Lifestyle shows
The Balancing Act (2021)
Raw Travel (2013)

Makeover reality shows
Ron Hazelton's HouseCalls (2000)

Movie talk shows
Made in Hollywood (2005)

Reality/crime shows
Bloodline Detectives (2020)
Forensic Justice (2021)
iCRIME With Elizabeth Vargas (2022)
I Met My Murderer Online (2022)
Missing (2003)
Murderous Affairs (2022)
Scene of the Crime (2021)

Reality court/judicial shows
America's Court with Judge Ross (2010)
Divorce Court (1999)
Hot Bench (2014)
Judge Mathis (1999)
Justice for All with Judge Cristina Perez (2012)
 Justice with Judge Mablean (2014)
The People's Court (1997)
Relative Justice with Rhonda Willis (2021)
Supreme Justice with Judge Karen (2013)
The Verdict with Judge Hatchett (2016)
We the People with Judge Lauren Lake (2022)

Sports shows
WOW – Women of Wrestling (2022)

Viral/viewer-submitted video series
Ring Nation (2022)
Weather Gone Viral (2020)
Whacked Out Sports (2006)
The World's Funniest Weather (2019)

Scripted series
Heartland (2010)
The Listener (2018)
Murdoch Mysteries (2014)

Entertainment Studios
The American Athlete (1996)
Beautiful Homes & Great Estates (2002)
Cars.tv (2009)
Comedy.tv (2009)
Comics Unleashed (2006) 
Entertainers (1993)
EntertainmentStudios.com (2002)
Every Woman (2000)
Kickin' It (2002)
My Destination.tv (2010)
Pets.tv (2009)
Recipe.tv (2004)
The Young Icons (2010)

Canceled/ended programs
These shows aired between 2000 and 2022, but production on these series has been halted.

Talk/conversation shows
The Ananda Lewis Show (2001–2002)
Anderson Live (2011–2013)
The Arsenio Hall Show (2013–2014)
Ask Rita (2003–2004)
Bethenny (2013–2014)
Better (2008–2012)
The Bill Cunningham Show (2011–2016)
The Bonnie Hunt Show (2008–2010)
The Brian McKnight Show (2009–2010) 
The Caroline Rhea Show (2002–2003)
The Cindy Margolis Show (2000–2001)
CityLine (2017–2019)
Crazy Talk (2015–2016)
Doctor and The Diva (2019–2020)
The Doctors (2008–2022)
Donny & Marie (1998–2000)
The Ellen DeGeneres Show (2003–2022)
Forgive or Forget (1998–2001)
FABLife (2015–2016)
 Face the Truth (2018–2019)
Good Day Live (2002–2005)
The Good Dish (2022)
The Gossip Queens (2010–2011)
The Greg Behrendt Show (2006–2007)
Harry (2016–2018)
Howard Stern Radio Show (1998–2001)
In the Loop with iVillage (2006–2008)
Iyanla (2001–2002)
The Jane Pauley Show (2004–2005)
The Jeff Probst Show (2012–2013)
The Jenny Jones Show (1991–2003)
The Jeremy Kyle Show (2011–2013)
Jerry Springer (1991–2018)
The John Walsh Show (2002–2004)
Dr. Joy Browne (1999–2000)
Katie (2012–2014)
The Dr. Keith Ablow Show (2006–2007)
The Larry Elder Show (2004–2005)
Dr. Laura (2000–2001)
Leeza (1994–2000)
Lifechangers (2011–2012)
Life & Style (2004–2005)
Living It Up! with Ali & Jack (2003–2004)
Martha (2005–2012; moved to Hallmark Channel in 2010)
Martha Stewart Living (1993–2004)
The Martin Short Show (1999–2000)
Maury (1991–2022)
The Megan Mullally Show (2006–2007)
The Mel Robbins Show (2019–2020)
Men are from Mars, Women are from Venus (2000–2001)
The Meredith Vieira Show (2014–2016)
The Montel Williams Show (1991–2008)
The Morning Show with Mike and Juliet (2007–2009)
The Nate Berkus Show (2010–2012)
Nick Cannon (2021–2022)
On Air With Ryan Seacrest (2004)
The Oprah Winfrey Show (1986–2011)
The Other Half (2001–2003)
The Dr. Oz Show (2009–2022)
Pickler & Ben (2017–2019)
The Queen Latifah Show (1999–2001)
The Queen Latifah Show (2013–2015)
The Real (2014–2022)
Richard Simmons' DreamMaker (1999–2000)
Ricki Lake (1993–2004)
The Ricki Lake Show (2012–2013)
The Rob Nelson Show (2002–2003)
The Robert Irvine Show (2016–2018)
The Roseanne Show (1998–2000)
The Rosie O'Donnell Show (1996–2002)
Sally (1985–2002)
The Sharon Osbourne Show (2003–2004)
Shop & Style (2003)
Dr. Steve (2011–2012)
Steve Harvey (2012–2017)
Steve (2017–2019)
Talk or Walk (2001–2002)
The T.D. Jakes Show (2016–2017)
The Test (2013–2014)
The Tony Danza Show (2004–2006)
The Trisha Goddard Show (2012–2014)
The Tyra Banks Show (2005–2010; moved to The CW in 2009) 
The Wayne Brady Show (2002–2004)
The Wendy Williams Show (2009–2022)

Tabloid/newsmagazine shows
All Access (2019–2021)
America Now (2013–2014)
A Current Affair (2005)
Celebrity Justice (2002–2005)
Central Ave (2020–2021)
DailyMailTV (2017–2022)
Geraldo at Large (2005–2007)
Hollyscoop (2009–2014)
Hollywood Today Live (2015–2017)
The Insider (2004–2017)
National Enquirer TV (1999–2001)
 On the Red Carpet (2013–2014)
Page Six TV (2017–2019)
Top 30 (2017–2019)

Game/competition shows
America Says (2019–2020)
Are You Smarter Than a 5th Grader? (2009–2011)
Card Sharks (2001–2002)
Celebrity Name Game (2014–2017)
Deal or No Deal (2008–2010)
Don't Forget the Lyrics! (2010–2011)
Hollywood Squares (1998–2004)
Let's Ask America (2014–2015)
Merv Griffin's Crosswords (2007–2008)
Monopoly Millionaires' Club (2015–2016)
On the Spot (2011–2012)
Pyramid (2002–2004)
Sex Wars (2000–2001)
Street Smarts (2000–2005)
Temptation (2007–2008)
To Tell the Truth (2000–2002)
Trivial Pursuit: America Plays (2008–2009)
Ultimate Poker Challenge (2004–2006)
Weakest Link (2002–2003)
Who Wants to Be a Millionaire (2002–2019)

Reality shows
American Idol Rewind (2006–2010)
America's Moving To (2002–2003)
Arrest & Trial (2000–2001)
Classmates (2003–2004) 
Life Moments (2002–2003)
NASCAR Angels (2006–2010)
Nightwatch (2020–2021)
Pet Keeping with Marc Morrone (2003–2004)
SOS: How to Survive (2021–2022)
Starting Over (2003–2006)
Storm of Suspicion (2020–2022)

Reality dating shows
Blind Date (1999–2006)
Change of Heart (1998–2003)
ElimiDate (2001–2006)
Excused (2011–2013)
EX-treme Dating (2002–2004)
The 5th Wheel (2001–2004)
Rendez-View (2001–2002)
Shipmates (2001–2003)
Who Wants to Date a Comedian (2011–2012)

Disputable discussion shows
The Chris Matthews Show (2002–2013)
Full Court Press With Greta Van Susteren (2019–2022)

Lifestyle shows
American Latino TV (2002–2019)
LatiNation (2004–2019)
Weekend Vibe (2002–2004)
Your Total Health (2004–2008)

Makeover reality shows
Ambush Makeover (2003–2004)
Bob Vila (2005–2007)
Bob Vila's Home Again (1990–2005)
Design Invasion (2004–2005)
Home Delivery (2004–2005)
Hometeam (2005–2006)
Live Like a Star (2004–2005)

Movie review shows
At the Movies (1986–2010)
Hot Ticket (2001–2004)
Reel Talk (2007–2009)

Reality/crime shows
Beyond With James Van Praagh (2002–2003)
The Conspiracy Show with Richard Syrett (2014–2015)
Corrupt Crimes (2015–2019)
Crime Watch Daily (2015–2018)
Crossing Over With John Edward (2000–2004)
Don't Blink (2017–2018)
Killer Mysteries (2017–2019)
Law&Crime Daily (2020–2022)
Live PD: Police Patrol (2018–2020)
Mysteries of the Unexplained (2017–2018)
Pat Croce Moving In (2004–2005)
Prime Crime (2021–2022)
The Sheriff's of El Dorado County (2017–2020)
True Crime Files (2018–2020)
Unexplained Mysteries (2003–2005)
Unsealed: the Alien Files (2012–2015)
Unsealed: Conspiracy Files (2012–2013)

Reality court/judicial shows
Caught In Providence (2018–2020)
Couples Court with the Cutlers (2017–2020)
Cristina's Court (2006–2009)
Curtis Court (2000–2001)
Eye for an Eye (2003–2008)
Family Court With Judge Penny (2008–2009)
Judge Alex (2005–2014)
Judge David Young (2007–2009)
Judge Faith (2014–2018)
Judge Hatchett (2000–2008)
Judge Jeanine Pirro (2008–2011; moved from The CW in 2009)
Judge Jerry (2019–2022)
Judge Joe Brown (1998–2013)
Judge Judy (1996–2021)
Judge Karen (2008–2009)
Judge Karen's Court (2010–2011)
Judge Maria Lopez (2006–2008)
Judge Mills Lane (1998–2001)
Jury Duty (2007–2008)
Last Shot With Judge Gunn (2011–2012)
Lauren Lake's Paternity Court (2013–2020)
Moral Court (2000–2001)
Personal Injury Court (2019–2020)
Power of Attorney (2000–2002)
Protection Court (2019–2020)
Street Court (2009–2010)
Swift Justice with Nancy Grace (2010–2012)
Texas Justice (2001–2005)
We the Jury (2002–2003)
We the People With Gloria Allred (2011–2013)

Sports shows
The George Michael Sports Machine (1984–2007)
UFC Wired (2007–2009)

Variety shows
The Big Big Show (2015–2016)
Dance 360 (2004–2005)
It's Showtime at the Apollo (1987–2007)
Soul Train (1971–2008)
That's Funny (2004–2006)
The Tom Joyner Show (2005–2006)
Your Big Break (2000–2001)

Viral/viewer-submitted video series
Bloopers (2012–2014)
Maximum Exposure (2000–2008)
Real TV (1996–2001)
Right This Minute (2011–2022)
Smash Cuts (2009–2011)
Whacked Out Videos (2009–2018)
What Went Down (2014–2017)
World's Funniest Moments (2010–2012)

Scripted series
Adventure Inc. (2003–2004)
Andromeda (2000–2005, moved to Sci-Fi in 2004)
Baywatch (1991–2001, moved from NBC)
Baywatch Hawaii (1999–2001)
Beastmaster (1999–2002)
Cleopatra 2525 (2000–2001)
Cold Squad (2006–2008)
Da Vinci's Inquest (2005–2012)
Earth: Final Conflict (1997–2002)
The First Family (2012–2015)
The Immortal (2000–2001)
Jack of All Trades (2000)
John Woo's Once a Thief (2002–2003)
Legend of the Seeker (2008–2010)
The Lost World (1999–2002)
Masterminds (2006–2008)
Mr. Box Office (2012–2015)
Mutant X (2001–2004)
Nite Tales (2009)
The Pinkerton's (2014–2015)
Psi Factor (1996–2000)
Queen of Swords (2000–2001)
ReGenesis (2007–2009)
Relic Hunter (1999–2002)
Republic of Doyle (2013–2016)
SAF3 (2013–2015)
She Spies (2002–2004)
Sheena (2000–2002)
Starhunter (2003–2004)
Stone Undercover (2007–2008)
Tracker (2001–2002)
V.I.P. (1998–2002)
Viper (1996-1999)
VIP Passport (2006–2007)
Xena: Warrior Princess (1995–2001)

See also
The CW Plus
MyNetworkTV, a broadcast syndication service (formerly a television network)

References

External links
First-run syndication – The TV IV

First-run syndicated television programs in the United States